Sablan, officially the Municipality of Sablan, is a 5th class municipality in the province of Benguet, Philippines. According to the 2020 census, it has a population of 11,588 people.

Etymology
The term "Sablan" was derived from the local word "Sabdang", a local tree which thrived in the area.

History
Sablan was created officially as a municipal district on July 1, 1927, under Executive Order No. 61 dated May 17, 1927 by then American Governor General Leonard Wood.

Geography
Sablan is at the mid-western tip of Benguet. It is bounded by Kapangan on the north, Tublay on the northeast, La Trinidad on the east, Baguio in the southeast, Tuba in the south, Aringay on the southwest, and Burgos to the west.

According to the Philippine Statistics Authority, the municipality has a land area of  constituting  of the  total area of Benguet.

Barangays
Sablan is politically subdivided into 8 barangays. These barangays are headed by elected officials: Barangay Captain, Barangay Council, whose members are called Barangay Councilors. All are elected every three years.

Climate

Demographics

In the 2020 census, Sablan had a population of 11,588.

Economy

Government
Sablan, belonging to the lone congressional district of the province of Benguet, is governed by a mayor designated as its local chief executive and by a municipal council as its legislative body in accordance with the Local Government Code. The mayor, vice mayor, and the councilors are elected directly by the people through an election which is being held every three years.

Elected officials

Education

Public schools
As of 2014, Sablan has 14 public elementary schools and 2 public secondary schools.

Private schools
Saint Louis School of Sablan is the only private secondary school in the municipality, located at Barangay Poblacion.

Transportation
Major roads within the Sablan include the Naguilian Road (formerly Quirino Highway) and Asin–Nangalisan–San Pascual Road.

Gallery

Notes

References

External links

 [ Philippine Standard Geographic Code]

Municipalities of Benguet